The 1962–63 NCAA men's basketball rankings was made up of two human polls, the AP Poll and the Coaches Poll.

Legend

AP Poll 
All AP polls for this season included only ten ranked teams.

UPI Poll

References 

1962-63 NCAA Division I men's basketball rankings
College men's basketball rankings in the United States